The men's Greco-Roman lightweight competition at the 1960 Summer Olympics in Rome took place from 26 to 31 August at the Basilica of Maxentius. Nations were limited to one competitor.

Competition format

This Greco-Roman wrestling competition continued to use the "bad points" elimination system introduced at the 1928 Summer Olympics for Greco-Roman and at the 1932 Summer Olympics for freestyle wrestling, though adjusted the point values slightly. Wins by fall continued to be worth 0 points and wins by decision continued to be worth 1 point. Losses by fall, however, were now worth 4 points (up from 3). Losses by decision were worth 3 points (consistent with most prior years, though in some losses by split decision had been worth only 2 points). Ties were now allowed, worth 2 points for each wrestler. The elimination threshold was also increased from 5 points to 6 points. The medal round concept, used in 1952 and 1956 requiring a round-robin amongst the medalists even if one or more finished a round with enough points for elimination, was used only if exactly three wrestlers remained after a round—if two competitors remained, they faced off head-to-head; if only one, he was the gold medalist.

Results

Stoyanov was disqualified after round 5 and his place in the standings vacated; the results below show the placement of wrestlers following that disqualification, which retroactively moved other wrestlers up in the standings.

Round 1

 Bouts

 Points

Round 2

 Bouts

 Points

Round 3

 Bouts

 Points

Round 4

The six-way tie for 5th place was not broken. It is not clear how the tie between Mousidis and Brötzner for 11th place was broken; the two had not faced each other.

 Bouts

 Points

Round 5

Freij's victory by decision over Matoušek resulted in both wrestlers having 6 points after the round and thus eliminated both wrestlers. Because Freij was the head-to-head victor, he held the tie-breaker and received the bronze medal.

During the bout between Koridze and Stoyanov, "the two spoke briefly and then Stoyanov stopped fighting and lost a decision." Yugoslavia protested the result of this match; a Stoyanov victory by decision would have eliminated both Koridze and Stoyanov, leaving Martinović the only remaining wrestler and therefore the gold medalist. Stoyanov was disqualified, stripping him of his 5th-place finish, but Koridze was not sanctioned and continued on to face Martinović in round 6.

 Bouts

 Points

Round 6

 Bouts

 Points

References

Wrestling at the 1960 Summer Olympics